José María Navalón Boya (born 13 April 2004), better known as Mari Boya, is a Spanish racing driver, who is currently racing for MP Motorsport in the 2023 FIA Formula 3 Championship. He previously competed in the Formula Regional European Championship during 2021 and 2022 and was the 2020 Spanish F4 vice-champion.

Career

Karting career 
Boya started competition karting in 2015, when he won the Spanish Karting Championship, and he repeated the same feat again in 2016. He won the championship again in 2018, this time in the Junior class, and came out victorious in the IAME Winter Cup that same year. The Spaniard stayed in karts until early 2020.

Lower formulae 
Boya made his car racing debut in the 2020 F4 Spanish Championship with MP Motorsport. He won three races throughout the course of the season, and finished second in the drivers' standings, only behind fellow rookie and teammate Kas Haverkort. Boya's most notable weekend came at MotorLand Aragón, where he won the first two races of the weekend, before finishing third in the final race.

Formula Regional

2021 
In April 2021 it was announced that Boya would be making his debut in the Formula Regional European Championship with Formula One World Champion Fernando Alonso's team, FA Racing. However at the last minute, he switched to Van Amersfoort Racing instead, partnering Francesco Pizzi and Lorenzo Fluxá. At the first round of the championship Boya scored five points, becoming the first driver to score points for the team that year.

2022 

Boya joined ART Grand Prix for the 2022 Formula Regional European Championship alongside Laurens van Hoepen and Gabriele Minì. However, after the sixth round at the Hungaroring, Boya was replaced by Esteban Masson at ART for unknown reasons. However, he was drafted to replace Michael Belov at MP Motorsport for the remainder of the season.

2023 
Boya is expected to compete the full season with MP Motorsport in the 2023 Formula Regional Middle East Championship.

FIA Formula 3 Championship 
In September 2022, Boya drove for MP Motorsport during the FIA Formula 3 post-season test. Just two months later, the Dutch outfit confirmed Boya's signing for the 2023 FIA Formula 3 Championship.

Karting Record

Karting career summary

Racing record

Racing career summary 

* Season still in progress.

Complete F4 Spanish Championship results 
(key) (Races in bold indicate pole position) (Races in italics indicate fastest lap)

Complete Formula Regional European Championship results 
(key) (Races in bold indicate pole position) (Races in italics indicate fastest lap)

Complete Formula Regional Middle East Championship results
(key) (Races in bold indicate pole position) (Races in italics indicate fastest lap)

* Season still in progress.

Complete FIA Formula 3 Championship results 
(key) (Races in bold indicate pole position) (Races in italics indicate fastest lap)

References

External links 
 
  (in Spanish)

2004 births
Living people
Spanish racing drivers
Formula Regional European Championship drivers
MP Motorsport drivers
Van Amersfoort Racing drivers
ART Grand Prix drivers
Spanish F4 Championship drivers
FIA Formula 3 Championship drivers
Formula Regional Middle East Championship drivers